Cry of the Hunted is a 1953 American crime film noir directed by Joseph H. Lewis.  The drama features Vittorio Gassman, Barry Sullivan and Polly Bergen.

Plot
An obsessive lawman (Barry Sullivan) who works for the state chases an escaped fugitive (Vittorio Gassman) through the Louisiana bayou.

Cast
 Vittorio Gassman as Jory
 Barry Sullivan as Lieutenant Tunner
 Polly Bergen as Janet Tunner
 William Conrad as Goodwin
 Mary Zavian as Ella
 Robert Burton as Warden Keeley
 Harry Shannon as Sheriff Brown
 Jonathan Cott as Deputy Davis

Reception
According to MGM records the film earned $376,000 in the US and Canada and $249,000 elsewhere resulting in a loss of $179,000.

Critical response
Film critic Hal Erickson, of Allmovie, has praised the directing of the film, writing, "On the whole, the MGM B product of the 1950s contained some of the studio's best-ever 'small' pictures...Cry of the Hunted is directed with flair by Joseph H. Lewis, who always managed to rise above the slimmest of budgets and the barest of production values."

TV Guide in its film guide also wrote well of the film, "Stylishly directed chase film from Lewis who had previously shown his talent in Gun Crazy...At one point he is caught but again breaks free, only to be recaptured again at the finale. Interesting subplot has Conrad waiting for Sullivan to make a wrong move so he can grab his job."

Noir analysis
Critics Alain Silver and Elizabeth Ward, in various sections of their analysis of the film, discuss a sub silentio theme found in the movie: the homosexual undercurrent of the protagonists; they write, "After an initial scene, in which Sullivan and Gassman wrestle each other to exhaustion and then sit sharing cigarettes like brothers," and, "...even in his sleep [Sullivan] is obsessive as he dreams of the escapee in homoerotic terms," and, "Gassman too seems drawn to his pursuer."

Film critic Eddie Muller, in an interview for Bright Lights Film Journal, agrees, "I once showed this goofy B film called Cry of the Hunted, with Barry Sullivan and William Conrad — it's swamp noir. In Los Angeles, the audience adored it. They howled, especially at the over-the-top gay subtext between the two lead actors. They fight, and when it's obvious the fight is over, they're still wrestling around the floor. Then they lie against the wall and smoke cigarettes. The L.A. audience ate it up."

References

External links
 
 
 
 

1953 films
1950s crime thriller films
American black-and-white films
American crime thriller films
1950s English-language films
Film noir
Films directed by Joseph H. Lewis
Metro-Goldwyn-Mayer films
1950s American films